National Highway 322 (NH 322) is a National Highway in India. This highway runs entirely in the state of Bihar. This highway provide connection between NH 22 and NH 122B at Hajipur in Vaishali and Musrigharari in Samastipur respectively.

References

National highways in India
National Highways in Bihar
Transport in Hajipur